The 1986 Scottish Cup Final was played on 10 May 1986 at Hampden Park in Glasgow and was the final of the 111th Scottish Cup. The previous winners were Celtic, who had beaten Dundee United in the 1985 final, but they were knocked out by Hibernian at the quarter-final stage. The Final was contested by Aberdeen and Heart of Midlothian, who had narrowly missed out on the league title just a week earlier, finishing second behind Celtic after losing to Dundee on the final day of the season. Aberdeen won the match 3–0, with goals from John Hewitt and Billy Stark. It was Aberdeen's fourth Scottish Cup triumph in five years, and was to be the last trophy won under the management of Alex Ferguson, who departed for Manchester United the following season.

Match details

Road to the final

References

1986
Cup Final
Scottish Cup Final 1986
Scottish Cup Final 1986
20th century in Glasgow